The 2015 Nürnberger Gastein Ladies was the 2015 edition of the Gastein Ladies clay court tennis tournament. It was the 9th edition of the tournament, and part of the 2015 WTA Tour. It took place in Bad Gastein, Austria between 20 and 26 July 2015.

Points and prize money

Point distribution

Prize money

Singles main-draw entrants

Seeds 

 1 Rankings are as of July 13, 2015.

Other entrants 
The following players received wildcards into the singles main draw:
  Barbara Haas
  Patricia Mayr-Achleitner
  Tamira Paszek

The following players received entry from the qualifying draw:
  Ana Bogdan 
  Daria Kasatkina 
  Petra Martić
  Aliaksandra Sasnovich
  Anastasija Sevastova
  Maryna Zanevska

The following players received entry as lucky losers:
  Richèl Hogenkamp
  Risa Ozaki

Withdrawals 
Before the tournament
  Jana Čepelová → replaced by  Risa Ozaki
  Kaia Kanepi → replaced by  Tímea Babos
  Tatjana Maria → replaced by  Anna-Lena Friedsam
  Christina McHale → replaced by  Danka Kovinić
  Yulia Putintseva → replaced by  Richèl Hogenkamp
  Tereza Smitková → replaced by  Stefanie Vögele

Retirements 
  Anna-Lena Friedsam
  Andreea Mitu
  Teliana Pereira

Doubles main-draw entrants

Seeds 

 1 Rankings as of July 13, 2015.

Other entrants 
The following pairs received wildcards into the main draw:
  Annika Beck /  Tamira Paszek
  Barbara Haas /  Patricia Mayr-Achleitner

Withdrawals
Before the tournament
  Kateřina Siniaková

Finals

Singles 

  Samantha Stosur defeated  Karin Knapp, 3–6, 7–6(7–3), 6–2

Doubles 

  Danka Kovinić /  Stephanie Vogt defeated  Lara Arruabarrena /  Lucie Hradecká, 4–6, 6–3, [10–3]

References

External links 
 Official website

Gastein Ladies
Gastein Ladies
2015 in Austrian women's sport
Gastein Ladies
2015 in Austrian tennis